Hilarographa mesostigmatias is a species of moth of the family Tortricidae. It is found in Taiwan.

References

Moths described in 1977
Hilarographini
Moths of Taiwan